Joe Andoe (born 1955) is an American artist, painter, and author. His works have been featured in exhibits internationally and also numerous museums including the Denver Art Museum, the Detroit Institute of Art, the Museum of Fine Arts in Boston, and the Whitney Museum of American Art. He is the author of the book  Jubilee City: A Memoir at Full Speed (P.S.), which is a memoir about his life.

Early life and education

Andoe was born on December 5, 1955, in Tulsa, Oklahoma.

Andoe loved to draw as a child but he never created any artwork until he was in college. Andoe first realized that painting could be his career when he was enrolled in community college studying agricultural business. He was taking an elective class in art history when he learned about artists such as Robert Smithson and Dennis Oppenheim. He soon changed his major an eventually earned a Master's Degree in Art from the University of Oklahoma in 1981.

Exhibitions

 2000, University at Buffalo Art Gallery Research Center in Art & Culture (Buffalo, NY)
 2001, Bemis Center for Contemporary Arts (Omaha, NE)
 2005, Longview Museum of Fine Arts (Longview, TX)
 2012, Ford Project (New York City, NY)

Select public collections

 Detroit Institute of Arts (Detroit, MI)
 The Herbert and Dorothy Vogel Collection at the National Gallery of Art (Washington, DC)
 Hood Museum of Art at Dartmouth College (Hanover, NH)
 Fred Jones Jr. Museum of Art, University of Oklahoma (Norman, OK)
 Metropolitan Museum of Art (New York, NY)
 Museum of Modern Art (New York, NY)
 Museum of Fine Arts (Boston, MA)
 Saint Louis Art Museum (St. Louis, MO)
 Museum of Contemporary Art (San Diego, CA)
 Sheldon Museum of Art (Lincoln, NE)
 Whitney Museum of American Art (New York, NY)

Writing career
Andoe began writing in 2002 and was first published in 2003 by Open City Magazine, a New York City magazine that featured many first-time writers. That same year he was published in Bomb and Bald Ego. Andoe had authored a comic book sized group of stories about his life and in 2005, Harper Collins asked him to create a longer version of the stories. These were the inspiration for the book Jubilee City: A Memoir at Full Speed (P.S.) which was published in 2007. The book received numerous reviews including from the New York Times and USA Today.

Personal life
Andoe currently lives in New York. He has two children, one son and one daughter.

References

External links
 Official website of Joe Andoe

1955 births
Living people
American memoirists
20th-century American painters
20th-century American male artists
American male painters
21st-century American painters
21st-century American male artists
Writers from Tulsa, Oklahoma
Artists from Tulsa, Oklahoma